Andreas Bjørn (28 October 1703 – 27 January 1750) was a Danish merchant, shipbuilder and ship owner.

Early life
Andreas Bjørn was born in Skælskør to  Mads Andersen Bjørn and Karen Pedersdatter. He settled as a merchant in Copenhagen in 1730 where he soon achieved success in the timber trade. From 1731 he supplied the Royal Danish Navy with provisions, cannons and large quantities of timber and from 1739 he also supplied the Royal Danish Army with cannons.

Ship building

In 1735, Andreas Bjørn obtained permission from King Christian VI to reclaim an area north of Christianshavn where he  established a shipyard. It became the largest shipyard in Denmark of its day, launching 50 ships until Bjørn's death 1750, including the 44-canon naval ship Copenhagen Castle (Kjøbenhavns Slot).

Oversea trade
Bjørn participated widely in overseas trade, especially with the Danish West Indies. In 1747, together with  Ulrik Frederik Suhm (1686-1758) and Frederik Holmsted (1683–1758), he founded Det almindelige Handelskompagni (English: The General Trading Company) which mainly traded with Iceland, Finnmark and later Greenland. The company took over part of his site at Christianshavn. Bjørn was also a partner in Danish West India Company and Danish Iceland Company.

Other pursuits
In 1747 the Royal Copenhagen Shooting Society moved their activities to a corner of Bjørnsholm. When Frederick V became a member later that same year, Bjørn arranged a large celebration at his own expense. The king, in return, appointed him as Royal Agent. In 1748, Bjørn was appointed as one of four directors of the new Royal Danish Theatre. At the time of his death, two ships were ready at his shipyard which were supposed to carry out explorations at his own expense along the coasts of Greenland.

Legacy
Andreas Bjørn's site at Christianshavn is now known as Wilders Plads, Krøyers Plads and Grønlandske Handels Plads after later owners. The old main building and a half-timbered workshop of his shipyard is still found at Wilders Plads. The Andreas Bjørn House at Strandgade is his former home. Andreas Bjørns Gade, also in Christianshavn, is named after him.

See also
 Andreas Bodenhoff

References

External links

 Source

1703 births
1750 deaths
18th-century Danish businesspeople
Danish businesspeople in shipping
18th-century Danish shipbuilders
Businesspeople from Copenhagen
People from Slagelse Municipality